The 1911 Argentine Primera División was the 20th season of top-flight football in Argentina. The season began on April 30 and ended on November 26.

The championship featured 9 teams, with each team playing the other twice. Racing Club made its debut.

Alumni regain the championship for the third time in succession, by beating Porteño in a championship playoff. It was the team's 10th title in 12 seasons and was also its last tournament disputed so the football team was disbanded at the end of the season due to financial problems.

Standings

Championship playoff
Alumni and Porteño finished level on points at the top of the table, being necessary the dispute of a playoff match, won by Alumni.

Match details

References

Argentine Primera División seasons
1911 in Argentine football
1911 in South American football
p
p